Our or OUR may refer to:
 The possessive form of "we"
 Our (river), in Belgium, Luxembourg, and Germany
 Our, Belgium, a village in Belgium
 Our, Jura, a commune in France
 Office of Utilities Regulation (OUR), a government utility regulator in Jamaica
 Operation Underground Railroad, a non-profit organization that helps rescue sex trafficking victims
 Operation Unified Response, the United States military's response to the 2010 Haiti earthquake
 Ownership, Unity and Responsibility Party, a political party in the Solomon Islands

See also
 Ours (disambiguation)